Pine Lawn is a city in St. Louis County, Missouri, United States. The population was 3,275 at the 2010 census.

Geography
Pine Lawn is located at  (38.695101, -90.275543).

Demographics

2010 census
As of the census of 2010, there were 3,275 people, 1,189 households, and 834 families living in the city. The racial makeup of the city was 1.5% White, 96.4% African American, 0.3% Native American, 0.1% Asian, 0.2% from other races, and 1.4% from two or more races. Hispanic or Latino of any race were 1.2% of the population.

There were 1,189 households, of which 41.3% had children under the age of 18 living with them, 17.7% were married couples living together, 44.9% had a female householder with no husband present, 7.5% had a male householder with no wife present, and 29.9% were non-families. 26.8% of all households were made up of individuals, and 9.2% had someone living alone who was 65 years of age or older. The average household size was 2.75 and the average family size was 3.31.

The median age in the city was 31.8 years. 31.1% of residents were under the age of 18; 9.8% were between the ages of 18 and 24; 24.8% were from 25 to 44; 22.3% were from 45 to 64; and 11.9% were 65 years of age or older. The gender makeup of the city was 44.7% male and 55.3% female.

2000 census
As of the census of 2000, there were 4,204 people, 1,469 households, and 1,066 families living in the city. The racial makeup of the city was 2.35% White, 95.96% African American, 0.12% Native American, 0.07% Asian, 0.40% from other races, and 1.09% from two or more races. Hispanic or Latino of any race were 0.38% of the population.

There were 1,469 households, out of which 34.6% had children under the age of 18 living with them, 24.0% were married couples living together, 42.1% had a female householder with no husband present, and 27.4% were non-families. 23.2% of all households were made up of individuals, and 7.3% had someone living alone who was 65 years of age or older. The average household size was 2.86 and the average family size was 3.38.

In the city, the population was spread out, with 33.6% under the age of 18, 9.6% from 18 to 24, 26.6% from 25 to 44, 19.9% from 45 to 64, and 10.3% who were 65 years of age or older. The median age was 30 years. For every 100 females, there were 79.8 males. For every 100 females age 18 and over, there were 71.2 males.

The median income for a household in the city was $21,500, and the median income for a family was $23,217. Males had a median income of $23,542 versus $22,399 for females. The per capita income for the city was $11,908. About 34.3% of families and 36.9% of the population were below the poverty line, including 54.5% of those under age 18 and 16.3% of those age 65 or over.

Police and Municipal Courts Controversy
Pine Lawn police issued some 17,000 traffic violations during 2014, in a town with about 2,300 adults, and has about 30,000 open warrants. For the fiscal year ending June 30, 2014, Pine Lawn had General Revenue in the amount of $3,532,167, $2,237,196 of this came from fine and fees from its Municipal Court. This amounts to 63% of its General Revenue or based the 2010 Census $683.11 for each of its 3,275 residents. The local prosecutor was criticized for this, because he is a lawyer for the Michael Brown family, and alleges overzealous enforcement by the Ferguson Police Department.

The report of the US Attorney General concerning the Ferguson Police Department prompted protests in Pine Lawn, Missouri as well. The use of police departments as revenue generation units may be widespread.

In October 2016, a former Pine Lawn police lieutenant was sentenced to 51 months in prison after being convicted of trumping up charges to arrest a challenger to then incumbent mayor Sylvester Caldwell. The officer coerced two store owners to falsely testify that the candidate had stolen a Caldwell campaign poster, then used that testimony   In December 2017, the United States Court of Appeals for the Eighth Circuit upheld the conviction. Caldwell was himself convicted and sentenced to prison for extortion in 2015.

References

External links
 "The Little City That Couldn't," The Riverfront Times, July 5, 2006

Cities in St. Louis County, Missouri
Cities in Missouri